Tründle and Spring is the debut EP by the American punk rock band Pinhead Gunpowder. It was originally released in 1991 through No Reality Records. The EP was later re-released through Duotone Records and Take a Day Records.

Track listing

Personnel
 Aaron Cometbus - drums
 Billie Joe Armstrong - guitar, vocals
 Sarah Kirsch - guitar, vocals
 Bill Schneider - bass, backing vocals

Production
 Kevin Army - production
 Aaron Cometbus - cover art, graphic design
 Murray Bowles - photography

References

Pinhead Gunpowder albums
1991 debut EPs